Mustahan Mijit (born 20 August 1998) is a Chinese footballer currently playing as a defender for Jiangxi Beidamen.

Career statistics

Club
.

References

1998 births
Living people
Chinese footballers
Association football defenders
China League One players
Xinjiang Tianshan Leopard F.C. players